Tunceli is an electoral district of the Grand National Assembly of Turkey. It elects 2 members of parliament (deputies) to represent the province of the same name for a four-year term by the D'Hondt method, a party-list proportional representation system.

Members 
A population review of every electoral district is conducted before each general election, which can lead to certain districts being granted a smaller or greater number of parliamentary seats. Tunceli has elected two members of parliament since 1961; previously, it elected three.

General elections 
Election results:

2011

June 2015

November 2015

2018

Presidential elections

2014

References 

Electoral districts of Turkey
Politics of Tunceli Province